Typha × glauca is a hybrid species of plant originating as a cross between T. angustifolia and T. latifolia. It shows invasive behavior in the Midwestern United States

References

External links
 Cattail hybrid  Wisconsin DNR

glauca
Freshwater plants
Plant nothospecies